Celtis schippii is a medium-sized evergreen tree native to the lowland rainforests of Central and South America. It grows up to 10–20 meters high.

References 

Trees of Ecuador
Trees of Panama
Trees of Costa Rica
Trees of Guatemala
Trees of Peru
schippii